Procladiini is a tribe of midges in the non-biting midge family (Chironomidae).

Genera & species
Genus Procladius Skuse, 1889
Subgenus Holotanypus Roback, 1982
P. choreus (Meigen, 1804)
P. crassinervis (Zetterstedt, 1838)
P. culiciformis (Linnaeus, 1767)
P. sagittalis (Kieffer, 1909)
P. signatus (Zetterstedt, 1850)
P. simplicistylis Freeman, 1948
Subgenus Psilotanypus Fittkau, 1906
P. flavifrons Edwards, 1929
P. lugens Kieffer, 1915
P. rufovittatus (van der Wulp, 1874)

References

Tanypodinae
Diptera tribes